The Pool of the 2004 Fed Cup Asia/Oceania Zone Group II composed of five teams competing in a round robin competition. The top two teams qualified for Group I next year.

Pacific Oceania vs. Kazakhstan

Singapore vs. Turkmenistan

Pacific Oceania vs. Turkmenistan

Singapore vs. Syria

Pacific Oceania vs. Syria

Kazakhstan vs. Turkmenistan

Pacific Oceania vs. Singapore

Kazakhstan vs. Syria

Kazakhstan vs. Singapore

Syria vs. Turkmenistan

  and  advanced to Group I for next year, where they both placed equal last. Thus both teams were relegated back to Group II for 2006.

See also
Fed Cup structure

References

External links
 Fed Cup website

2004 Fed Cup Asia/Oceania Zone